Mikhail Karnaukhov (born February 22, 1994) is a Belarusian professional ice hockey Goaltender who is currently playing for Metallurg Novokuznetsk in the Supreme Hockey League (VHL) and the Belarusian national team.

He participated at the 2017 IIHF World Championship.

References

External links

1994 births
Living people
Belarusian ice hockey goaltenders
Ice hockey people from Minsk
HC Dinamo Minsk players